Bhandara Road railway station serves Bhandara City and surrounding areas in Bhandara district in Maharashtra, India.

Electrification
The entire main line was electrified in stages. The Gondia–Bhandara Road section in 1990–91 and Bhandara Road–Tharsa section in 1991–92.

References

Bhandara
Railway stations in Bhandara district
Nagpur SEC railway division
Railway stations in India opened in 1888